The Gay Cavalier was a 1957 British television adventure series set during the English Civil War and starring Christian Marquand as a fictionalised Captain Claude Duval. The series was made by Associated Rediffusion and shown on ITV between May and August 1957.

In truth, Duval was a successful gentleman highwayman who came from France to post-Restoration England, but The Gay Cavalier portrayed him in heroic fashion. In each of the series 13 episodes, Duval was to be seen embarking on an adventure which required him to undertake such tasks as retrieving a piece of treasure, thwarting a plot by the Roundheads or saving a woman in trouble. Each of the adventures was self-contained and Duval was often accompanied on these exploits by a female companion (usually a different one in each episode).

The series also featured a number of other actors who generally appeared in one of the adventures. These included Christopher Lee, John Le Mesurier, Conrad Phillips, Nigel Stock and Sam Kydd.

The series was similar in genre to others of the time, such as The Adventures of Robin Hood, and though it was shot on film, it is unique in that not one of its episodes has survived.

External links 
 
 Brief description of The Gay Cavalier

ITV television dramas
1950s British drama television series
1957 British television series debuts
1957 British television series endings
Lost television shows
Television series set in the 17th century
British adventure television series
Television shows produced by Associated-Rediffusion
Black-and-white British television shows
English-language television shows